Miriam Kearney (born 20 July 1959) is a former Irish Fine Gael politician who served as a Senator from 1981 to 1982, after being nominated by the Taoiseach Garret FitzGerald. 

She held the record as the youngest member of Seanad Éireann, being 22 years old on appointment.

A University College Cork alumna, Kearney was at the time a member of Young Fine Gael and chairperson of its International Affairs Committee.

In 1981, she supported the abolition of jury trials in accident compensation cases. She also voted for the abolition of the death penalty.

She was in charge of the Taoiseach's itinerary and managed his campaign tour during the February 1982 election.

She stood for the Industrial and Commercial Panel at the February 1982 Seanad election but was not elected. She later became Assistant General Secretary of Fine Gael.

References

1959 births
Living people
Fine Gael senators
Members of the 15th Seanad
20th-century women members of Seanad Éireann
Politicians from County Cork
Alumni of University College Cork
Nominated members of Seanad Éireann
Young Fine Gael